Sharkdog is a children's computer animated streaming television series. Created by Singaporean artist Jacinth Tan Yi Ting, the series premiered on Netflix on September 3, 2021. A special, titled Sharkdog's Fintastic Halloween, was released on October 15, 2021.

A second season premiered on June 30, 2022 with Jordan Gershowitz taking over as head writer for Ed Valentine. On January 18, 2023, it was announced the series was renewed for a third season.

Premise
This show is about ten-year-old Max and his best friend Sharkdog, who is half-shark, half-dog, and all appetite. Blissfully unaware of his own strength, stealth and general sharkiness, Sharkdog often leaves a trail of chaos in his wake.

Voice cast
 Liam Mitchell as Max
 Dee Bradley Baker as Sharkdog
 Kari Wahlgren as Mia, Dennis Muckford, Delilah Dourbouche
 Aly Mawji as Royce
 Judy Alice Lee as Olivia
 Meaghan Davies as Annabelle
 Donna J. Fulks as Mayor Muckford
 Jenny Lorenzo as Christina
 Villa Junior Lemanu as Aleki
 Jentel Hawkins as Ms. Williams
 Max Mittelman as Brody Ceviche
 Ian James Corlett as Mr. Heubel

Production
The series was first announced in April 2020 by Netflix.

Episodes

Season 1 (2021)

Season 2 (2022)

Specials

Release
Sharkdog was released on Netflix on 3 September 2021.

References

External links
 at Netflix

2021 American television series debuts
2020s American animated television series
2020s American children's comedy television series
American children's animated comedy television series
American computer-animated television series
English-language Netflix original programming
Netflix children's programming
Animated television series about children
Animated television series about dogs